Balny (F729) is a  in the French Navy.

Development and design 

Designed to navigate overseas, the escort escorts were fully air-conditioned, resulting in appreciated comfort, which was far from being the case for other contemporary naval vessels.

A posting on a Aviso-escort was a boarding sought after by sailors because it was a guarantee of campaigning overseas and visiting the country.

Four other similar units were built at Ateliers et Chantiers de Bretagne (ACB) in Nantes for the Portuguese Navy under the class name João Belo.

All French units were decommissioned in the mid-1990s. Three ships were sold to the Uruguayan Navy.

In 1984, Commandant Rivière underwent a redesign to become an experimentation building. It will retain only a single triple platform of 550mm anti-submarine torpedo tubes and all the rest of the armament was landed, replaced by a single 40mm anti-aircraft gun and two 12.7mm machine guns.

Construction and career 
Balny was laid down in March 1960 at Arsenal de Lorient, Lorient. Launched on 17 March 1962 and commissioned on 1 February 1970.

She was decommissioned in 1994 and serve as a breakwater in Lanvéoc-Poulmic from 1994 to 2003.

Sunk as target in 2003.

Citations 

Ships built in Lorient
1962 ships
Commandant Rivière-class frigates